Mercy Island is a 1941 American drama that was nominated at the 14th Academy Awards, held in 1941, for Best Score of a Dramatic Picture, for which Walter Scharf and Cy Feuer received nominations.

Plot
A young man takes his wife and a friend on a fishing trip to the Florida Keys on a boat owned by local Conks. Following a blow on the head when their boat hits a shallow bottom and loses its propeller, the husband becomes mentally unstable and believes his wife is having an affair.

Cast

Ray Middleton as Warren Ramsey 
Gloria Dickson as Leslie Ramsey 
Otto Kruger as Dr. Sanderson 
Donald Douglas as Clay Foster
Forrester Harvey as Captain Lowe
Terry Kilburn as Wiccy

References

External links 
 

 

1941 drama films
1941 films
American black-and-white films
American drama films
Republic Pictures films
Films scored by Walter Scharf
Films set in Florida
Films shot in Florida
Films based on American novels
Films directed by William Morgan (director)
1940s English-language films
1940s American films